The Lean Construction Institute (LCI) was founded in August 1997 by Glenn Ballard, Greg Howell, Iris Tommelein and Todd Zabelle as a for profit research, development, and advisory company focused on the application of Lean for construction projects as outlined below from the original chartering documents:

'"The Lean Construction Institute (LCI) is a research organization with a very particular focus on production management, the way work is done, in construction. We are very different from other organizations because our first goal is to understand the underlying “physics” of production. This means we want to understand the effects of dependence and variation along supply and assembly chains. These physical issues are ignored in current practice and have no relationship to teamwork, communication, or contract. These human issues are at the top of practitioner’s lists of concerns because they do not, indeed cannot see the source of their problems in physical production terms."' 

The four partners envisioned that LCI would terminate operations after ten years (in 2007) as the fundamental problems would have been understood and addressed. In 2000, it was made a non-profit corporation. The institute does research to develop knowledge regarding project based Lean Principles and Methods in the design, engineering, and construction of capital facilities.

The organisation has several international communities of practice, including ones in Australia, Ireland, Scandinavia and the UK (LCI-UK Ltd is a UK-registered charity).

References

External links
Lean Construction Institute 
Lean Construction Institute Australia 
German Lean Construction Institute

Construction organizations